Roberto Marchesi (born 10 April 1966) is an Italian biathlete. He competed in the sprint event at the 1988 Winter Olympics.

References

1966 births
Living people
Italian male biathletes
Olympic biathletes of Italy
Biathletes at the 1988 Winter Olympics
Sportspeople from Bergamo